Francisco Flaminio Ferreira Romero (born 17 September 1970), commonly known as Francisco Ferreira, is a former Paraguayan football striker.

Ferreira started his career in Sportivo Luqueño, where at a very young age became one of the team's most prolific strikers leading the Paraguayan League in goalscoring in 1993. His excellent form in 1993 caught the attention of Club Olimpia, who signed Ferreira for the 1994 season. He would then play for teams in Colombia, Chile, Peru, Bolivia and Ecuador, as well as returning to Paraguay to play for Sportivo Luqueño and Cerro Porteño. In 2000, he was the league's topscorer again, with 23 goals.

At the national team level, Ferreira was part of the Paraguay squad during the 1992 Olympic Games and was capped for a few other occasions until 2000.

References

External links
 
 
 

1970 births
Living people
Paraguayan footballers
Club Sol de América footballers
Sportivo Luqueño players
Cerro Porteño players
Club Olimpia footballers
Millonarios F.C. players
C.F. Pachuca players
Liga MX players
Oriente Petrolero players
The Strongest players
Deportes La Serena footballers
Paraguayan Primera División players
Bolivian Primera División players
Categoría Primera A players
Expatriate footballers in Chile
Expatriate footballers in Mexico
Expatriate footballers in Bolivia
Expatriate footballers in Ecuador
Expatriate footballers in Colombia
Paraguay international footballers
Footballers at the 1992 Summer Olympics
Olympic footballers of Paraguay
Paraguayan expatriates in Colombia
Paraguayan expatriates in Bolivia
Association football forwards